Konstantinos "Kostas" Petropoulos is a Greek former professional basketball coach, and a retired professional basketball player. During his playing career, he was nicknamed "Nureyev".

Professional career
During his pro club career, Petropoulos played basketball with the Greek club Apollon Patras, from 1971 to 1987. On 4 April 1976, in a Greek Second Division game between Apollon Patras and Agrinio, Petropoulos scored 93 points. On 11 January 1986, in a Greek First Division game between Apollon Patras and Ionikos Nikaias, Petropoulos scored 51 points.

After having six surgeries due to injuries, Petropoulos retired from playing pro club basketball in 1987, at the age of 31. Over his pro club career, Petropoulos scored a total of 4,255 points in Greece's top-tier level Basket League.

National team career
With Greece's junior national teams, Petropoulos played at the 1973 FIBA Europe Under-16 Championship, and at the 1974 FIBA Europe Under-18 Championship.

Petropoulos was also a member of the senior men's Greek national team. He played in 77 games with Greece's senior national team. With Greece, he won the gold medal at the 1979 Mediterranean Games. He also played with Greece at the 1980 FIBA European Olympic Qualifying Tournament, and at the 1981 EuroBasket.

Coaching career

Clubs
After he finished his playing career, Petropoulos became a basketball coach. He acted as the head coach of the Greek clubs Apollon Patras, Sporting, Maroussi, and Panellinios.

Greek NT
Petropoulos was the head coach of the senior men's Greek national team, from 1999 to 2001. He was Greece's head coach at the 1999 EuroBasket and the 2001 EuroBasket.

References

External links
FIBA Archive Profile
Hellenic Basketball Federation Player Profile 

Living people
1956 births
Apollon Patras B.C. coaches
Apollon Patras B.C. players
Competitors at the 1979 Mediterranean Games
Greece national basketball team coaches
Greek basketball coaches
Greek Basket League players
Greek men's basketball players
Maroussi B.C. coaches
Mediterranean Games gold medalists for Greece
Mediterranean Games medalists in basketball
Panellinios B.C. coaches
Basketball players from Patras
Peristeri B.C. coaches
Small forwards
Sporting basketball players
Sporting B.C. coaches